The Halt is a 2019 Filipino dystopian drama film edited, written, and directed by Lav Diaz. It was screened in the Directors' Fortnight section at the 2019 Cannes Film Festival.

Synopsis 
Set in the 2030s after a massive volcanic eruption, Manila has been in the dark for the last three years without a single sunlight. Riots control countries and communities. Epidemics ravage the continent. Millions have died and millions more have left.

Cast
Hazel Orencio
Joel Lamangan
Piolo Pascual
Shaina Magdayao
Dolly de Leon

Reception 
On Rotten Tomatoes, the film has an approval rating of 88% based on 8 reviews.

It won Best Film at the Asian Film Festival Barcelona.

References

External links
 

2019 films
2019 drama films
Films directed by Lav Diaz
Philippine drama films